Events from the 1440s in Denmark.

Incumbents
 Monarch – Christopher III (until 5 January 1448), Christian I
 Steward of the Realm –  Albrecht Morer (1439–40), Erik Nielsen Gyldenstjerne (1441–42), Otte Nielsen Rosenkrantz (1445–52)

Events
 1443
 1 January  Coronation of Christopher III in Ribe Cathedral.

1448
 Christian I becomes King.

1449
 28 October  Coronation of Christian I in Copenhagen.

Births

Deaths
1448
 5 January – Christopher III (b. 1418)

References

1440s in Denmark